Aven Amentza is a Romanian non-government organisation established in 1997 that seeks to improve the social position of the country's Roma minority, while also enhancing Roma rights and combating anti-Roma discrimination. It is also involved in research activities that analyse the situation of the Roma in Romania.

External links

Human rights organizations based in Romania
Romani in Romania
Romani rights
1997 establishments in Romania
Organizations established in 1997